The 2022–23 Harvard Crimson men's basketball team represented Harvard University in the 2022–23 NCAA Division I men's basketball season. The Crimson, led by 15th-year head coach Tommy Amaker, played their home games at the Lavietes Pavilion in Boston, Massachusetts as members of the Ivy League.

Previous season
The Crimson finished the 2021–22 season 13–13, 5–9 in Ivy League play to finish in a tie for sixth place. They failed to qualify for the Ivy League tournament, as only the top 4 teams qualify.

Roster

Schedule and results

|-
!colspan=12 style=| Non-conference regular season

|-
!colspan=9 style=| Ivy League regular season

Sources

References

Harvard Crimson men's basketball seasons
Harvard Crimson
Harvard Crimson men's basketball
Harvard Crimson men's basketball
Harvard Crimson men's basketball
Harvard Crimson men's basketball